"You" is a song by The Who, Written by their Bassist John Entwistle and sung by Roger Daltrey, This is one of two songs written by John Entwistle for the Face Dances album (The Who's first album without Keith Moon; Kenney Jones of The Small Faces and The Faces is on drums instead,) the other song being "The Quiet One". It was also released on the B-side of "Don't Let Go the Coat" single.

Background

The song was initially intended to appear on one of John Entwistle's solo albums, but drummer Kenney Jones convinced him to use the song for The Who. Jones said "When I first joined (The Who), John (Entwistle) and I used to go down to Shepperton and just work out and have a play. He was working on this song and trying to arrange it, we both sort of arranged it together. I just loved it so much, he was going to put it on his solo album, and I said 'I think that's a definite Who song. You can't do that.' I made him sit on it for a year until we actually started recording. I'm so pleased I did it is definitely one of those exciting songs."

"You" was never performed live by The Who, but it was played by John Entwistle's solo bands.

Reception

Authors Alan Parker and Steve Grantley said that the song was "possibly the worst lyrics John ever penned." They also said that the lyrics "highlight just how desperate for material the band were."

References

The Who songs
1980 songs
Songs written by John Entwistle
Song recordings produced by Bill Szymczyk